M. juncea may refer to:

 Machaeranthera juncea, an aster native to northern Mexico
 Machaerina juncea, a rhizomatous plant
 Macrotyphula juncea, a gilled mushroom
 Maerua juncea, a dicotyledonous plant
 Menodora juncea, a perennial plant
 Mollugo juncea, an annual plant